The acronym UDEM, UdeM or U de M may refer to the following universities:

 Université de Moncton, New Brunswick, Canada
 Université de Montréal, Quebec, Canada
 University of Monterrey (Universidad de Monterrey), Monterrey, Nuevo León, Mexico

See also
 U of M (disambiguation)
 UDM (disambiguation)
 UM (disambiguation)